Keshav Dattatreya Nayak is a distinguished DRDO scientist and Director of Advanced Numerical Research and Analysis Group in Hyderabad, India.

Awards
Nayak has been awarded many times for his scientific contributions
DRDO Award for contribution to Integrated Guided Missile Development Program in 1989.
IETE-IRSI (83) Award for 1997-98 for outstanding contribution in the field of radar and microwave systems.
Technology Day Invention Award by National Research Development Corporation.

References

Engineers from Andhra Pradesh
Living people
Bangalore University alumni
Indian military engineers
Year of birth missing (living people)